Fontenay is a commune in the Vosges department in Grand Est in northeastern France. The inhabitants of Fontenay are called the Fontenaysians.

Geography

History
Fontenay is a village of fountains, hence the name "Fontenay". There are more than twenty outdoor fountains in operation and numerous indoor wells in the village which are fed from springs in the forest.

Economy
The village counts numerous small enterprises with economic activities including:
Agriculture
Air conditioning and heating systems
Auberge
Bakery, Pastry shop, Grocery outlet
Bar & Wine cellar
Carpentry 
Dog care
Energy studies for buildings
Hairdresser
Insurance agency
Interior decoration
Masonry and Construction
Real Estate Agent
Magnetic healer

Sites and Monuments

Politics and Administration

Mayor and Town Council and Community Committees
Mayor: Krista Finstad-Milion

Deputy Mayors and Town Councillors:
First Deputy Mayor: Jacques Siméon 
Second Deputy Mayor: Roger Guiguemdé 
Third Deputy Mayor: Olivier Perdreau

Town Councillors:
Jean-François Bonnard, Luc Boutry (Security, Presybtère management, collective heating system), Martine Chachay (cemetery management, stray animals, sustainable flower beds), Martine Chrisment (Elderly care), Julien Chrisment (Forestry and wood cutting), Carine Christophe, Adelaïde Crouvisier, Anne-Marie Lasausse (Tresury), François Poirot (Garden management)

Intercommunality
Fontenay belongs to the Bruyères-Vallons des Vosges intercommunality.

Demography
In 2016 the population of the village was 519.

Associations
The village counts several associations. The "Jeanne d'Arc (Joan of Arc) Association" which promotes organ playing on one of the numerous organs belonging to the association, summer sessions, and organ concerts.  There is also an informal group of vintage Solex (motorcycle) owners, youth and adults, who regularly organise outings.

See also 
 Communes of the Vosges department

References 

Communes of Vosges (department)